Vincent Ignatius Kennally (June 11, 1895 – April 12, 1977) was a Roman Catholic bishop.

Born in Dorchester, Massachusetts, Kennally was ordained a priest for the Society of Jesus on June 20, 1928. On June 4, 1946, he was appointed apostolic administrator of the Vicariate Apostolic of Caroline and Marshall Islands. On December 6, 1956, Kennally was appointed Vicar Apostolic of Caroline and Marshall Islands and titular bishop of Sassura and was ordained bishop on March 25, 1957. He retired on September 20, 1971.

Notes

1895 births
1977 deaths
Clergy from Boston
20th-century American Jesuits
20th-century American Roman Catholic titular bishops
Roman Catholic bishops of Caroline Islands